Ulf Lövaas (born 24 March 1947 in Holmestrand, Norway) is a former international motorcycle speedway rider  who represented Norway in World Team Cup and rode in the UK for two seasons - 1973 for Cradley Heathens and 1974 for Oxford Rebels. 
Brother Dag also rode for Oxford Rebels in 1975.

References 

1947 births
Living people
Norwegian speedway riders
Cradley Heathens riders
Oxford Cheetahs riders
Reading Racers riders
People from Holmestrand
Sportspeople from Vestfold og Telemark